The huge moth family Noctuidae contains the following genera:

A B C D E F G H I J K L M N O P Q R S T U V W X Y Z

Ufeus
Ugana
Ugia
Ugiodes
Ulochlaena
Ulolonche
Ulosyneda
Ulotrichopus
Uncula
Uniptena
Uniramodes
Uollega
Upothenia
Uracontia
Uripao
Ursogastra
Usbeca
Uzinia
Uzomathis

References 

 Natural History Museum Lepidoptera genus database

 
Noctuid genera U